"Push Upstairs" is a song by British electronic music group Underworld from their fifth album, Beaucoup Fish. It was released as a single on 15 March 1999. In business, to "push upstairs" means to promote someone either unwillingly or with an ulterior motive. The single peaked at number 12 on the UK Singles Chart.

Track listings 

UK CD1
 "Push Upstairs" – 4:34
 "Push Upstairs" (Roger S. Blue Plastic People mix) – 8:13
 "Push Upstairs" (Adam Beyer Mix 1) – 4:56

UK CD2
 "Push Upstairs" (The Large Unit) – 5:38
 "Push Upstairs" (Darren Price mix) – 6:47
 "Please Help Me" – 7:29

UK, US, and Japanese 12-inch single
A1. "Push Upstairs" – 4:34
A2. "Push Upstairs" (The Large Unit) – 5:38
B1. "Push Upstairs" (Roger S. Blue Plastic People mix) – 8:13

European CD single
 "Push Upstairs" – 5:38
 "Please Help Me" – 7:29

Australian CD single
 "Push Upstairs" – 4:34
 "Push Upstairs" (Adam Beyer Mix 1) – 4:56
 "Push Upstairs" (Roger S. Blue Plastic People mix) – 8:13
 "Push Upstairs" (Darren Price mix) – 6:47
 "Please Help Me" – 7:29

Japanese CD single
 "Push Upstairs" – 4:34
 "Push Upstairs" (Adam Beyer Mix 1) – 4:56
 "Push Upstairs" (Roger S. Blue Plastic People mix) – 8:13
 "Push Upstairs" (Darren Price mix) – 6:47
 "Push Upstairs" (The Large Unit) – 5:38
 "Please Help Me" – 7:29

Charts

Weekly charts

Year-end charts

References

External links
 Underworldlive.com

Underworld (band) songs
1999 singles
1998 songs
Songs written by Darren Emerson
Songs written by Karl Hyde
Songs written by Rick Smith (musician)
V2 Records singles